Luis Antonio Ubiñas (born 1963) is an American investor, businessman and nonprofit leader. He served as the president of the Ford Foundation from 2008 through 2013. Prior to joining the Ford Foundation, he had an 18-year career as a senior partner at McKinsey & Company. He is currently on the board of several public and private corporations, including Electronic Arts, where he is Lead Director and chair of the Nominating and Governance Committee, ATT and Tanger. He also advises several private companies, including Ebsco, the digital information provider. Last, he is a trustee of the Mercer Funds. In the nonprofit sector, he served as president of the Board of Trustees of the Pan American Development Foundation from 2015 to 2019, serves as an Advisory Committee member for the United Nations Fund for International Partnerships, is Chairman of the Statue of Liberty-Ellis Island Foundation and serves on the Executive Committee of the New York Public Library. He is also active in the arts as a collector, donor and board member.

Early life
Ubiñas grew up in the South Bronx in New York City. His mother, a native of Puerto Rico, was a seamstress. His father, also form Puerto Rico, died when Ubiñas and his four siblings were young. He is an alumnus of A Better Chance, a non-profit which assists gifted young people of color attend highly-ranked secondary schools. Ubiñas graduated magna cum laude from Harvard University in 1985 with a degree in government. He was a Truman Scholar. In 1989, he graduated from Harvard Business School as a Baker Scholar with highest honors.

Career
Ubiñas spent eighteen years at McKinsey & Company as a consultant in the areas of telecommunications, technology and media.  He helped found the Media Practice at McKinsey, where as a senior partner he led the Practice on the West Coast; his work centered on the introduction and development of the underlying technologies and applications of internet technologies, both wired and wireless.  Ubiñas also served as president of the Ford Foundation for six years.  He is now an investor and entrepreneur.

Ford Foundation
Ubiñas served as president of the Ford Foundation from January 2008 through 2013. During his tenure as president, Ubiñas significantly restructured the organization. The restructuring effort focused the foundation's number of program areas from over 200 to 35, and defined eight major issues, including access to education, economic opportunity and human rights, as its core objectives. Ubiñas increased the Ford Foundation's focus on social justice issues. He also reinvested over 80% of the Foundation's endowment, moving its endowment performance from bottom quartile to top quartile performance among endowments over $3 billion, renovated the network of international offices and modernized the Foundation's systems. During his tenure operating costs fell 33%, while grantee satisfaction rose.  Most importantly, Ubinas focused the Foundation's programs on Social Justice issues.

Restructuring during the 2008/9 financial crisis was not without controversy, since, a few months after announcing $22 million in budget cutbacks in spring 2009, Ford announced the closure of field offices in Vietnam and Russia and offered voluntary severance packages to some New York staff to trim an additional $14 million from the budget.  All savings were shifted to the grantee budget, to help social justice organizations in the United States and abroad survive the financial crisis.

Pan American Development Foundation
From 2015 to 2019, Ubiñas served as the president of the Board of Trustees of the Pan American Development Foundation, an organization that works with governments, non-profit organizations and corporations to fund and administer development projects in Central and South America and the Caribbean.

Other activities
Ubiñas is Chairman of the  Statue of Liberty-Ellis Island Foundation and the New York Public Library, where he is a member of the Executive Committee and Chair of the Finance Committee. He serves as an Advisory Committee Member for the United Nations Fund for International Partnerships which overseas the United Nations' relationships with non-governmental partners, where he is in his fourth term, appointed by two Secretaries General. He has also served on the Advisory Committee for Trade Policy and Negotiation, the Advisory Committee for the Export-Import Bank of the United States, and as Northwest Regional Chair for White House Fellows. He has held top-secret national security clearance.

In the private sector, Ubiñas is a board member of Aura Financial, which provides ethical credit to unbanked communities; GFR Media, the largest media company in Puerto Rico; and EBSCO industries, the leading provider of full text academic content to libraries, universities and private sector entities. He is a Lead Director at Electronic Arts and serves on the Boards of two other public companies: Boston Private Bank, the wealth management firm, and Tanger, the real estate investment trust. He is also a Trustee of the Mercer Funds.

Personal life
His wife, Deborah Tolman, is a developmental psychologist and a leading feminist scholar. They have two sons, Max and Ben.

References

1963 births
American nonprofit executives
Harvard Business School alumni
Living people
McKinsey & Company people